Charles Defrémery (8 December 1822 – 18 August 1883) was a 19th-century French orientalist, specialist in Arabic and Persian history and literature.

He held the chair of Arabic language and literature at the École des langues orientales and was a member of the Société Asiatique of Paris. On 2 December 1860, he was appointed corresponding member of the St Petersburg Academy of Sciences for the Oriental literary department. He was elected a member of the Académie des inscriptions et belles-lettres in 1869. From 1871, he held the chair of Arabic at the Collège de France.

Selected works 
1842: Histoire des sultans du Kharezm, par Mirkhond. Texte persan, accompagné de notes historiques, géographiques et philologiques 
1845: Histoire des Samanides, par Mirkhond. Texte persan, traduit et accompagné de notes critiques, historiques et géographiques
1854: Voyages d'Ibn Battuta (4 volumes, 1853-1859)
1854:Mémoires d'histoire orientale, suivis de Mélanges de critique, de philologie et de géographie
1858:Gulistan, ou le Parterre de roses, par Sadi, traduit du persan et accompagné de notes historiques, géographiques et littéraires

References

External links 
 Charles Defréremy on data.bnf.fr
  Fiche sur le site de l'Académie des sciences de Russie

French orientalists
French Arabists
Translators to French
Translators from Persian
Arabic–French translators
French Iranologists
Academic staff of the Collège de France
Corresponding members of the Saint Petersburg Academy of Sciences
Members of the Académie des Inscriptions et Belles-Lettres
Members of the Société Asiatique
1822 births
People from Cambrai
1883 deaths
19th-century French translators